The Conseil des arts et des lettres du Québec (CALQ) is a public agency founded in 1994 by the government of Quebec.

CALQ offers support and funding for art projects in the performing arts, multidisciplinary arts, circus arts, visual arts, media arts, architectural research, arts and crafts, and literature. It also seeks to broaden the influence of Quebec culture in Canada and abroad, and supports the advanced training of writers and professional artists.

Ordre des arts et des lettres du Québec
In 2015, CALQ awarded the inaugural Ordre des arts et des lettres du Québec, honouring achievement in Quebec arts and letters, on the occasion of its 20th anniversary. Thirty-five inductees were added to the order in its first year, including 13 board members. Though inspired by France's Ordre des Arts et des Lettres, the Quebec order differs in that it has only one grade, that of companion.

Board members
As of January 2013, the Conseil's board of directors are:
 Marie DuPont, Chair of the Board of Directors
 Yvan Gauthier, Chief Executive Officer
 Francine Bernier, Vice-president of the Board of Directors, Director General and Artistic Director of Agora de la danse (Montréal)
 Agathe Alie, Assistant Vice-President - Global Citizenship and Public Affairs Director at Cirque du Soleil
 Michel Biron, Author, Full professor in the Department of French Language and Literature at McGill University
 Charles-Mathieu Brunelle, Director general of Espace pour la vie de Montréal
 Alan Côté, Director general and Artistic Director of Village en chanson de Petite-Vallée
 Luc Courchesne, Media artist, Professeur titulaire, École de design industriel, Faculté de l'aménagement of Université de Montréal, Créateur-chercheur associé at Société des arts technologiques
 Luc Gallant, CA, Chartered accountant, Associate Partner - KPMG
 Mona Hakim, Exhibition curator, art critic and instructor in art history
 Jo-Ann Kane, Curator of the collection of the National Bank of Canada, President of the Association des Collections d'entreprises du Québec, Independent curator
 Stéphane Laforest, Artistic Director and Conductor of Orchestre symphonique de Sherbrooke, Executive and Artistic Director and Conductor of Orchestre la Sinfonia de Lanaudière, First assistant conductor of Orchestre Symphonique de Montréal
 Louise Lemieux-Bérubé, Artist and Chief Executive Officer of Centre des textiles contemporains de Montréal
 Dominique Payette, Professor - Département d'information et de communication of Université Laval

See also
 Canada Council for the Arts
 Ontario Arts Council

References

External links
 Website of the Conseil des arts et des lettres du Québec
 Ententes du Conseil des arts et des lettres du Québec (CAlQ) dans le cadre du programme UNESCO-Aschberg

Quebec government departments and agencies
Organizations based in Quebec City
Arts councils of Canada
Arts organizations established in 1994
Orders of merit